James Brown "Jim" Allen (born June 14, 1927) is an American historian of Mormonism and was an official Assistant Church Historian of the Church of Jesus Christ of Latter-day Saints (LDS Church) from 1972 to 1979. While working as Assistant Church Historian, he co-authored The Story of the Latter-day Saints with Glen Leonard. After Ezra Taft Benson dismissed the book as secular new history, other events led to the dissolution of the LDS Church History department in 1982. Allen resigned as Assistant Church Historian in 1979, returning to work at Brigham Young University (BYU) full-time.

He studied history at Utah State University (USU) for his Bachelor's, at BYU for his master's, and the University of Southern California for his PhD. After working as a seminary teacher and coordinator of seminaries, he joined the history department at BYU in 1964, where he was department chair from 1981 to 1987. After his retirement in 1992, he was a senior research fellow at the Joseph Fielding Smith Institute for Latter-day Saint History.

Early life and education
On June 14, 1927, Allen was born in Ogden, Utah. During his childhood, his family lived in Coalville, Utah, Salt Lake City, Utah, Fairview, Wyoming, and Afton, Wyoming. His family moved to Logan, Utah when he was ten, to give him and his siblings the opportunity to go to college. After graduating from high school in 1945, he joined the U.S. Navy and became a Navy photographer in Washington, D.C. A member of the LDS Church, he served as a proselyting missionary in the California Mission under Oscar W. McConkie from 1948 to 1950, "without purse or scrip," depending on the generosity of others for his room and board.

As an undergraduate student, Allen attended USU in Logan, receiving a B.A. in history in 1954. George Ellsworth  and Eugene Campbell were two of his most influential teachers. During Campbell's graduate history seminar on how to write history, which Allen took as a senior undergraduate, Allen met Leonard J. Arrington, a new economics professor and classmate who greatly influenced Allen's career. Allen's paper from that seminar was published in Utah Historical Quarterly in 1955 and became the basis for his graduate studies. Allen pursued his M.A. in history at BYU, with Dr. Richard D. Poll as his major professor. In 1956, he completed his thesis, The Development of County Government in the Territory of Utah, 1850-1896, which drew from his earlier published article. Allen attended the University of Southern California on a full-tuition scholarship and received a Ph.D. in history in 1963. His dissertation, The Company Town in the American West, was later published as a book by the University of Oklahoma Press.

Career
Starting in 1954, Allen worked for the Church Educational System (CES) in a variety of roles. In Kaysville, Utah he was a seminary teacher, as well as in Cowley, Wyoming, where he was also the coordinator of seminaries from 1955 to 1957. He taught at LDS Institutes of Religion for nine years, and was director of the institutes in Long Beach and San Bernardino, California while pursuing his doctorate at USC.

Allen joined the religion faculty at BYU in 1963, and then the history department in 1964. He taught both religion and history classes. In the early 1970s he was the doctoral major professor and mentor of Ron Esplin, who would become another notable Mormon historian. He was chair of the history department from 1981 to 1987, and afterward held the Lemuel Hardison Redd Jr. Chair in Western American History, until his 1992 retirement. From 1992 to 2005, he was a senior research fellow with BYU's Joseph Fielding Smith Institute for Latter-day Saint History, and served on its executive committee for a time. In 2002, he taught in the History Department of Brigham Young University—Hawaii as a volunteer. He co-edited The Joseph Smith Papers, Journals, Vol. 2.

Fellow historian Davis Bitton listed James B. Allen as a historian who maintains his church membership while also having a deep understanding of church history, arguing that the existence of faithful historians shows that a knowledge of LDS church history does not necessarily lead to leaving the church.

Mormon History Association
In 1965, Allen was one of the founders of the Mormon History Association (MHA), along with Leonard J. Arrington. He served as its vice-president in 1970 and president in 1972.  Representing the MHA, Allen wrote and edited the "Historian's Corner," a semi-annual column in the quarterly BYU Studies from 1970 to 1982, when he was succeeded by Ronald W. Walker. The Mormon History Association selected Allen to discuss the impact of the Hoffman forgeries, describing Allen as "a senior historian whose work has commanded respect among [his] colleagues."

Assistant Church Historian
In 1972, Allen was called to be an Assistant Church Historian for the LDS Church, at the request of Leonard J. Arrington.  He served half time in that capacity, continuing his BYU professorship at the same time.  Arrington had assembled a team of professional historians to engage in new academic research with use of the church archives. Among the first major publications to emerge was The Story of the Latter-day Saints, a comprehensive single-volume history of the LDS Church written by Allen and Glen M. Leonard, a Senior Historical Associate in the church's Historical Department, and published in 1976.

The book was well received by the general and academic audiences, but some church leaders were uncomfortable. Allen's philosophy was to directly address historical controversies, while casting them against the context of their own time.  Ezra Taft Benson denounced the book as new history that was "underplaying revelation" at a fireside and later, at an address for CES instructors. It was not republished for years, despite its popularity. Spencer W. Kimball and Howard W. Hunter both privately praised the book. In 1979, Allen resigned as Assistant Church Historian and returned full-time to BYU. Around this time, the department's History Division came under greater suspicion and scrutiny, and its staff and programs were curtailed before being transferred to BYU in 1982 as the Joseph Fielding Smith Institute for Church History.

At BYU, Allen was treated in "a scandalous way" by some religion faculty who were unhappy with his book.  Later, some university trustees had reservations about Allen's 1981 appointment as chair of the history department.  However, he retained leadership roles at BYU until his 1992 retirement, when he rejoined the staff and programs from the old History Division, at BYU's Joseph Fielding Smith Institute.

Personal life 
Allen served in his church throughout his life, including as a Bishop of a student ward at Brigham Young University (BYU) in the 1960s and a stake high councilor.  In politics, he also served for a time as a District Republican committeeman. From 1999 to 2000, Allen and his wife served as full-time missionaries for the Church Education System at the Boston Institute of Religion.

Allen lives in Orem, Utah and is married to Renée Jones. They have five children and twenty grandchildren.  One of his daughters married the writer Orson Scott Card. Orson Scott Card cites his admiration for Allen as having "the kind of skepticism [...] that is a servant to orthodox faith." Allen's younger brother, John H. Allen, was a Colonel in the United States Army Reserve, the commander over the Judge Advocate General units of the 96th Sustainment Brigade, and a Federal Bankruptcy Judge.

Awards
1968 Best Bibliography Award from the Mormon History Association
1980 Morris Rosenblatt award for best popular interest article in Utah Historical Quarterly
1984 Distinguished Faculty Lecturer at Brigham Young University
1986 David Woolley Evans and Beatrice Cannon Evans Biography Award
1987 T. Edgar Lyon Award for Best Article from the Mormon History Association
1988 Fellow of the Utah State Historical Society
1991 T. Edgar Lyon Best Article Award from the Mormon History Association
1994 T. Edgar Lyon Award of Excellence from the Mormon History Association
2000 Special Citation for the book Studies in Mormon History, 1830-1997 from the Mormon History Association
2001 CHOICE Outstanding Academic Title from the American Library Association
2007 Leonard J. Arrington Award for meritorious service to Mormon history from the Mormon History Association

Published works
Allen has published over ninety articles, and fourteen books and monographs.

Books

(Republished in 2002 as No Toil nor Labor Fear: The Story of William Clayton)

Selected articles

Notes

External links
James B. Allen's website
 
James B. Allen Papers, MSS 2183, L. Tom Perry Special Collections, Harold B. Lee Library, Brigham Young University

1927 births
20th-century Mormon missionaries
21st-century American historians
21st-century American male writers
American Latter Day Saint writers
American Mormon missionaries in the United States
American leaders of the Church of Jesus Christ of Latter-day Saints
Brigham Young University alumni
Brigham Young University faculty
Brigham Young University–Hawaii faculty
Church Educational System instructors
Historians of the American West
Historians of the Latter Day Saint movement
Latter Day Saints from Utah
Living people
Mormon studies scholars
Official historians of the Church of Jesus Christ of Latter-day Saints
People from Orem, Utah
University of Southern California alumni
Utah Republicans
Utah State University alumni
Writers from Logan, Utah
Harold B. Lee Library-related 20th century articles
American male non-fiction writers